The Sony E 16mm F2.8 is a wide-angle prime lens for the Sony E-mount, announced by Sony on June 11, 2010.

Despite featuring the shortest focal length of any prime lens currently manufactured by Sony, the 16mm lens is infamous for its strong pincushion distortion, heavy chromatic aberration, and overall image softness. However, some of this can be digitally corrected in the camera.

The lens can also be adapted with a 12mm ultra-wide angle or a 10mm fisheye converter, which are both sold separately from the lens itself.

See also
List of Sony E-mount lenses

References

Camera lenses introduced in 2010
16
Pancake lenses